Paul Malcolm King (born 9 January 1948, Dagenham, Essex, England), is an English musician who was a member of Mungo Jerry between 1970 and 1972. He contributed occasional lead vocals, and played acoustic guitar (6- and 12-string), banjo, harmonica, kazoo and jug. His songs on the first Mungo Jerry album and on the early maxi-singles were generally more folksy and lighter in style than those of group leader Ray Dorset, and he was frustrated when his own songs were constantly rejected for subsequent albums.

On the second album, Electronically Tested, his composition "Black Bubonic Plague" appeared on European copies only, but not on the British release. In 1972, King recorded a solo album, Been in the Pen Too Long; he left Mungo Jerry shortly afterward.

He and the group's keyboard player Colin Earl (born 6 May 1942, Hampton) formed the King Earl Boogie Band with guitarist Dave Lambert, bassist Russell John Brown and washboard player Joe Rush, who had been a part-time Mungo Jerry member. Their album Trouble at Mill, produced by Dave Cousins of Strawbs, was well reviewed, but a single, "Plastic Jesus", was banned by the BBC on grounds of blasphemy. The group disbanded a few months later, and Lambert later joined Strawbs.

King then pursued a solo career, releasing occasional records under the names P. Rufus King and D’Jurann D’Jurann (no connection with the British group Duran Duran), as well as under his usual name.  

King and Earl later formed Skeleton Krew, though in the 1990s they reverted to the name of King Earl Boogie Band.  King retired to Cornwall in 1996, though since then he has occasionally joined his colleagues and former members for one-off gigs, sometimes under the name Skeleton Krew or Skeleton Crew.

References

External links

1948 births
Living people
English songwriters
English rock musicians
English folk musicians
People from Dagenham
Mungo Jerry members